You Might Be Surprised is a studio album by American musician Roy Ayers. It was released in 1985 through Columbia Records. Recording sessions for the album took place at Celestial Sounds and Mediasound in New York City. Production was handled by James Mtume and Roy Ayers with co-production by Philip Field  and Edward "Tree" Moore.

Track listing

Chart history

References

External links 

1985 albums
Roy Ayers albums
Columbia Records albums
Albums produced by Roy Ayers